Altha is a small town in Calhoun County, Florida, United States. The population was 536 at the 2010 census. This is an increase from 506 . Altha was founded in 1902.

Geography

Altha is located at  (30.571710, –85.127533).

Altha is located in northwestern Florida, approximately 45 minutes from the Georgia state line and one hour from the Alabama state line. Altha is in a rural county, with the primary industry being agriculture. Tomatoes, watermelons, green vegetables, cucumbers, peanuts, corn, wheat, and cotton are all major crops in this farming area. The timber industry also thrives in the area, with many farmers electing to plant pine trees.

Businesses and attractions 

The largest employer in Altha is Oglesby Plants International. The Chipola River, about three miles west of Altha, offers swimming, tubing, canoeing, kayaking, and fishing opportunities.

Weather
Altha has an average high temperature of 76 degrees Fahrenheit, with an average low of 51 degrees Fahrenheit. Summers in this area are quite hot and humid, with afternoon showers frequently occurring during the summer months. Altha is located about 35 miles from the Gulf of Mexico, so when tropical storms or hurricanes approach the coastline, weather can become severe. In 2004, during Hurricane Ivan, dozens of homes were destroyed and four people were killed because of a severe tornado striking near the town.

The coldest part of the winter occurs during late January and early February. Temperatures at night can dip as low as the lower 30s, and in some isolated instances, even striking the low to mid 20s. The last measurable snowfall occurred December 23, 1989 where 2 inches of snow fell. January and February can be cool months, with temperatures occasionally struggling to reach 60 degrees Fahrenheit.

In October 2018, Altha and the surrounding areas were hit by Hurricane Michael. Hurricane Michael, listed as a category 5 hurricane, and the strongest to ever hit North West Florida, caused extensive damage to the town. The old high school building, known as the white building, and many homes were damaged and/or destroyed as a result.

Education

Altha, served by the Calhoun County School District is home to the K–12 Altha Public School, established early after the turn of the twentieth century.

The "white building", as it was known as, has since been demolished due to Hurricane Michael. The new school building has been opened up since then. More in depth information is listed in a different Wiki Page specifically for the school.

(Picture in use is outdated.)

Sports 
The girls' volleyball team has won numerous district, region, and state semi-finals playoffs as well. Altha School runs boys' basketball, volleyball, softball, baseball, weightlifting, and a cross-country team. The girls' and boys' weightlifting teams have won several state championships.

Demographics

As of the census of 2010, there were 536 people and 219 households in the town. The racial makeup of the town was 99.5% Caucasian and 0.5% Asian or Hispanic/Latino. 

The population was 47 percent male and 53 percent female. Twenty-three percent of the population was under 18 and 15.5 percent was 65 or over.

References

Towns in Calhoun County, Florida
Towns in Florida